The Government of the 22nd Dáil or the 17th Government of Ireland (30 June 1981 – 9 March 1982) was the government of Ireland formed after the 1981 general election. It was a minority coalition government of Fine Gael and the Labour Party led by Garret FitzGerald as Taoiseach.

The 17th Government lasted for  days.

17th Government of Ireland

Nomination of Taoiseach
The 22nd Dáil first met on 30 June 1981. In the debate on the nomination of Taoiseach, Fianna Fáil leader and outgoing Taoiseach Charles Haughey, and Fine Gael leader Garret FitzGerald were both proposed. The nomination of Haughey was defeated with 79 votes in favour to 83 against, while the nomination of FitzGerald was carried with 81 in favour and 78 against. FitzGerald was appointed as Taoiseach by President Patrick Hillery.

Members of the Government
After his appointment as Taoiseach by the president, Garret FitzGerald proposed the members of the government and they were approved by the Dáil. They were appointed by the president on the same day.

Notes

Attorney General
On 30 July 1981, Peter Sutherland SC was appointed by the president as Attorney General on the nomination of the Taoiseach.

Ministers of State
On 30 June 1981, the Government appointed Ministers of State on the nomination of the Taoiseach.

Budget
On 27 January 1982, the Minister for Finance John Bruton proposed the budget. The budget was defeated with 81 votes cast in favour and 82 votes cast against. The Taoiseach sought a dissolution of the Dáil, which was granted by the president, leading to the February 1982 general election.

See also
Dáil Éireann
Constitution of Ireland
Politics of the Republic of Ireland

References

1981 establishments in Ireland
1982 disestablishments in Ireland
22nd Dáil
Cabinets established in 1981
Cabinets disestablished in 1982
Coalition governments of Ireland
Governments of Ireland